Bavel may refer to:

Babel (disambiguation), in the Hebrew bible, the name of Babylon
Bavel, Netherlands, a village south-east of Breda
Bavel District, a district of Battambang Province, Cambodia
Bavel (commune), a commune of Bavel District, Cambodia
Bas van Bavel (born 1964), Dutch historian
Bavel (restaurant), a Middle Eastern restaurant in Los Angeles